The Lorraine 12Rcr Radium was an inverted liquid-cooled 60º V-12 piston engine, designed specifically for use by French racing seaplanes competing in the Coupe d'Aviation Maritime Jacques Schneider  (commonly known as the Schneider Trophy) air races in the early 1930s.

Design and development
From the first Schneider Trophy race in 1913, France had a deep desire to fulfil the requirements of Jacques Schneider by winning the competition three times consecutively. Despite this desire, success for French aircraft was not forthcoming. To help address shortcomings, the STIAé ( service technique et industriel de l'aéronautique) issued a specification to three companies for a racing float-plane to compete in the 1932 Schneider Trophy. Power for the three aircraft was to be supplied by an engine specifically designed for the task, the Lorraine 12Rcr Radium.

The 12 Rcr was an inverted V-12 liquid-cooled engine with supercharger and reduction gearbox. Testing on the bench was also carried out with Rateau Turbo-chargers, but

Operational history
Six engines were ordered, but it is unclear how many were completed, as the examples supplied to Bernard and Nieuport-Delage were merely empty shells for use as mock-ups. Bench testing commenced in March 1931, two months after the intended delivery to the airframe manufacturers, progressing slowly, leading to the first delivery of a complete engine to Dewoitine in July 1931. The second engine was tested at the Lorraine plant up to 3,000 rpm, but this highlighted concerns over the airworthiness of the engine, which was rejected for flight use. Once Great Britain had permanently secured the Schneider Trophy, further development of the Schneider racers and their specialised engines was abandoned.

Applications
The 12Rcr was intended to power the following racing seaplanes:
Bernard H.V.220
Nieuport-Delage NiD.651
Dewoitine HD.412

Specifications (12Rcr) 
}

References

Further reading
  
 
 
 

1930s aircraft piston engines
Lorraine aircraft engines